Gobburi Jagga Raya  (1614–1617 CE) was a de facto King of Vijayanagara Empire on behalf adopted nephew named Chenga Raya, a rival claimant to the Vijaynagara thorne. He was the brother of Venkata II’s favourite Queen Obayamma who was bequeathed the Pulicat region and belonged to the Gobburi family of Nayaks under the Vijayanagar Empire.

Life
In 1614, after the death of Venkata II, Jagga Raya murdered Sriranga II the succeeding King and his family, but Rama Deva Raya, Sriranga II’s son escape from Vellore. The murder of the Royal family created shock and horror throughout the kingdom, fomenting hatred of Jagga Raya and his group.

Thus Many nobles and chieftains deserted the Jagga Raya faction and joined Rama Deva Raya's camp, which backed a legal royal claimant. He help from the Nayaks of Gingee and Madurai, both eager to get out of the Vijayanagara bond, to attack Rama Deva and his alliance.

Battle of Toppur
Jagga Raya and his allies, the Nayaks of Madurai, Nayaks of Gingee, Chera ruler and  Portuguese from the coast assembled a large army near Tiruchirapalli. Both the Armies met at the Toppur, at an open field on the northern banks of River Cauvery, between Tiruchirapalli and Grand Anicut in late 1616.

In the Battle Jagga Raya's troops could not withstand the aggression generated by the imperial forces. Yachama Nayakadu, the Nayak of Kalahasti and Raghunatha Nayaka, the generals of the imperial camp led their forces with great discipline. Jagga Raya was slain by Yachama, and his army was broken in the ranks which subsequently took flight by early 1617.

References
 
 Sathianathaier, R. History of the Nayaks of Madura [microform] by R. Sathyanatha Aiyar ; edited for the University, with introduction and notes by S. Krishnaswami Aiyangar ([Madras] : Oxford University Press, 1924) ; see also ([London] : H. Milford, Oxford university press, 1924) ; xvi, 403 p. ; 21 cm. ; SAMP early 20th-century Indian books project item 10819.
K.A. Nilakanta Sastry, History of South India, From Prehistoric times to fall of Vijayanagar, 1955, OUP, (Reprinted 2002) .
 

17th-century Indian monarchs
1617 deaths
People of the Vijayanagara Empire
Hindu monarchs
1614 births
Indian Hindus